Michael Huey (born September 28, 1988) is an American football offensive guard who is currently a free agent. He played college football at the University of Texas and attended Kilgore High School in Kilgore, Texas. He has been a member of the San Diego Chargers, Seattle Seahawks, Arizona Rattlers, Washington Redskins and Atlanta Falcons.

Early years
Huey played high school football for the Kilgore High School Bulldogs. He was named first-team 4A all-state by the Associated Press and the Texas Sports Writers Association as a senior. Huey was also named all-district, all-region, and district 12-4A Lineman of the Year his senior year. He was a starter in the 2007 U.S. Army All-American Bowl.

College career
Huey played football for the Texas Longhorns from 2007 to 2010. He appeared in 13 games at guard and on special teams as a freshman. He appeared in 13 games his sophomore year, starting three. Huey appeared in 13 games his junior year, starting nine. He started eight games at left guard his senior year and was a second-team Academic All-Big 12 selection. He was also one of four team captains for the year.

Professional career

Seattle Seahawks
Huey was signed by the Seattle Seahawks of the NFL on July 26, 2011 after going undrafted in the 2011 NFL Draft. He was released by the Seahawks on August 3, 2011.

San Diego Chargers
Huey signed with the NFL's San Diego Chargers on August 9, 2011. He was released by the Chargers on August 30, 2011.

Arizona Rattlers
Huey was signed by the Arizona Rattlers of the Arena Football League on December 1, 2011. He started 14 games as a rookie and was named First-team All-Arena in 2012. The Rattlers defeated the Philadelphia Soul 72–54 to win ArenaBowl XXV on August 10, 2012. He was signed to a three-year deal by the Rattlers on October 22, 2012. Huey was named Second-team All-Arena in 2013, starting 17 games. The Rattlers defeated the Philadelphia Soul 48–39 in ArenaBowl XXVI on August 17, 2013, to win their second straight ArenaBowl championship. He was named First-team All-Arena for the second time in 2014 as the Rattlers defeated the Cleveland Gladiators 72–32 in ArenaBowl XXVII on August 23, 2014, to win their third straight league championship. Huey also has nine receptions for three touchdowns in his career. Huey was activated on May 17, 2016.

Washington Redskins
On November 17, 2014, Huey was signed to the practice squad of the Washington Redskins of the NFL. He was released by the Redskins on December 1, 2014.

San Diego Chargers
Huey signed with the San Diego Chargers on March 31, 2015. He was released by the Chargers on September 5 and signed to the team's practice squad on September 6, 2015. He was released by the Chargers on September 25 and re-signed to the team's practice squad on September 29, 2015. Huey was released by the Chargers on October 6 and signed to the team's practice squad on October 21, 2015. He was released by the Packers on October 24, 2015. He was re-signed to the team's practice squad on December 28, 2015. Huey signed a reserve/future contract with the Chargers on January 5, 2016. He was released by the Chargers on May 12, 2016.

Atlanta Falcons
On June 7, 2016, Huey signed with the Atlanta Falcons. On August 27, 2016, he was waived by the Falcons.

Return to the Rattlers
Huey signed with the Arizona Rattlers on June 20, 2017. On July 8, the Rattlers defeated the Sioux Falls Storm in the United Bowl by a score of 50–41.

References

External links
Just Sports Stats

Living people
1988 births
American football offensive linemen
Arizona Rattlers players
Atlanta Falcons players
People from Longview, Texas
Players of American football from Texas
San Diego Chargers players
Seattle Seahawks players
Texas Longhorns football players
Washington Redskins players